Saint-Martin-de-Bavel is a commune in the Ain department in eastern France.

Demographics

In 2019, the commune had 444 inhabitants, an increase of 4.0% compared to 2013. Its inhabitants are called Saint-Martenant(e)s in French.

Land distribution

Typology 
Saint-Martin-de-Bavel is a rural commune. It is a commune of relatively low density as classified by the national commune density classification of the INSEE.

The commune is part of the Belley region as defined by the INSEE. This region, which encompasses 31 communes, contains less than 50,000 inhabitants in total.

Geography 
According to the European land distribution database Corine Land Cover (CLC), there is significant agricultural land use in the region (57.7% in 2018)—a lesser figure than in 1990 (62.8%). In 2018, the detailed land breakdown was the following: forests (36%), agricultural zones (23.7%), meadows (22.7%), arable land (11.3%), urban areas (4.8%), shrubs and/or herbaceous vegetation (1.6%).

Personalities
 Joseph-Benoît (1812-1880), a canut from Lyon, was born in Saint-Martin-de-Bavel.
 Jean Augustin Carrié de Boissy (1764-1838), a French military man, died in Saint-Martin-de-Bavel.
 Louis-Anthelme Carrier (1773-1838), military general, was born and died in the commune.

See also
Communes of the Ain department

References

Communes of Ain
Ain communes articles needing translation from French Wikipedia